WBYU (1450 AM) was a radio station licensed in New Orleans, Louisiana and served the New Orleans metropolitan area. The station was owned by The Walt Disney Company and featured programming from Radio Disney (2003-2011).

History
The AM 1450 frequency began on 1420 when WBNO, licensed to Coliseum Place Baptist Church, moved there from 1200 in 1938.  The call letters became WNOE on June 23, 1939, shortly after James A. Noe gained control of the station. On March 29, 1941, the FCC shifted most broadcast frequencies nationwide, and WNOE moved to 1450.  WNOE moved to 1060 on June 1, 1950, to become a 50 kW station.  Royal Broadcasting Corporation began operating WTIX on 1450 on December 5, 1951, with a Classical format.  WTIX was sold to Mid Continent Broadcasting, owned by Todd Storz, on September 10, 1953, and the format flipped to Top 40. In 1958, WTIX purchased the 690 frequency from WWEZ and subsequently donated 1450 to the Orleans Parish School Board.  WNPS began broadcasting May 7, 1958 with a 600 LP library donated by Mitch Miller and Columbia Records.  In the fall of 1966 it broke away from strictly classical music, shifting more to popular music and introducing news and weather reports.  WNPS moved to nostalgia and easy listening in 1973 before flipping to country in July 1974.  In 1977 the station was sold to Sun Broadcasting, who flipped it to a "contemporary" soft rock & jazz format branded "14-D" that lasted four months.  In August 1977 the station flipped to Adult standards playing big band and New Orleans jazz and changed call letters to WWIW (the Way It Was) on September 14.  In 1988, easy-listening WBYU-FM abruptly flipped to country, creating a public uproar.  WWIW owner David Smith immediately petitioned the FCC for the highly recognizable call letters, and 1450 began broadcasting as WBYU with no format change on November 28, 1988.

In 2001 the station was sold to Beasley Broadcast Group, who flipped the format on April 23 of that year to a brokered health talk format, simulcasting WWNN in Boca Raton, Florida.  The non-stop infomercials continued until February 6, 2003, when new owners ABC, Inc., who bought the station in 2002, flipped it to Radio Disney.  On September 26, 2011, WBYU went silent as ABC sought a buyer for the station. On September 27, 2012, ABC surrendered WBYU's license to the Federal Communications Commission (FCC). The FCC cancelled the station's license and deleted the WBYU call sign from their database on October 3, 2012.

References

WBYU
Radio stations established in 1976
Defunct radio stations in the United States
Radio stations disestablished in 2012
1976 establishments in Louisiana
2012 disestablishments in Louisiana
Defunct mass media in Louisiana
Former subsidiaries of The Walt Disney Company